The 1983 Big Sky Conference men's basketball tournament was held March 11–12 at Centennial Coliseum 

Weber State defeated  in the championship game  to clinch their fourth Big Sky tournament title.  and Wolf Pack were the regular season co-champions, while Idaho was attempting to win a third consecutive 

Format
First played in 1976, the Big Sky tournament had the same format for its first eight editions. The regular season champion hosted and only the top four teams from the standings took part, with seeding based on regular season records. 

No teams made their inaugural tournament appearances this season. This year was the final Big Sky tournament with four teams; it expanded to include all eight teams in 1984.

The first tiebreaker in the standings were the head-to-head meetings; Nevada defeated Weber twice during the conference regular season, so the Wolf Pack won the regular season title. Montana defeated defending champion Idaho in both games to claim the third seed in the bracket.

Bracket

NCAA tournament
The Wildcats received an automatic bid to the 52-team NCAA tournament and were seeded ninth in the West region; they lost to Washington State by ten points in the first round in Boise, Idaho.

References

Big Sky Conference men's basketball tournament
Tournament
Big Sky Conference men's basketball tournament
Big Sky Conference men's basketball tournament
Basketball competitions in Reno, Nevada
College basketball tournaments in Nevada
College sports tournaments in Nevada